Paschke is a surname. Notable people with the surname include:

Ed Paschke (1939–2004), American painter
Jim Paschke (born 1950), American sportscaster
Karl Theodor Paschke (born 1935), former Under Secretary General for the United Nations
Markus Paschke (born 1963), German politician
Melanie Paschke (born 1970), German sprinter
Norbert Paschke, East German sprint canoer
Olive Dorothy Paschke (1905–1942), Australian military nurse

References

de:Paschke